Nicolas Benjamin Swaim (born 8 November 1977) is a Northern Mariana Islander professional football player and manager.

Career
As a defender he plays for the MP United F.C.

In 2008, he made his debut for the Northern Mariana Islands national football team. and he coached the Northern Mariana Islands national football team.

References

External links

Profile at Soccerpunter.com

1977 births
Living people
American soccer players
Northern Mariana Islands footballers
Northern Mariana Islands international footballers
Association football midfielders
American soccer coaches
Northern Mariana Islands football managers
Northern Mariana Islands national football team managers